The Latvian National Encyclopedia is a universal encyclopedia in Latvian, which was published in 2018 to mark the centenary of the independence of Latvia. The board of editors of the encyclopedia works as an affiliate of the National Library of Latvia.

Overview

Background 
The first complete encyclopedia was issued during the Soviet occupation as the Latvian Soviet Encyclopedia from 1981 to 1988.

Modern edition 
The National Encyclopedia project was launched in late 2014. , a Latvian IT company, was selected as the provider of the electronic platform of the encyclopedia on 18 December 2014. The editorial board of the encyclopedia began its work in July 2015.

The making of the encyclopedia is supervised by the Council of the National Encyclopedia led by the Latvian Minister of Culture (Dace Melbārde at the time of the launch). The Board of Editors consists of four editors and the Chief Editor, Dr. hist. Valters Ščerbinskis, whereas the Professional Editor Board is made up of 46 consultants, each assigned to a certain topic, and is led by National Library of Latvia director . From 2014 to 2018, annual budget funding towards the creation of the encyclopedia was €200-250 thousand, which in total amounted to €1,1 million.

The 864-page thick, first paper edition of the encyclopedia was released in October 2018 with a price tag of €38.50. It is thematically focused on Latvian topics and is dedicated to the Centenary of the Republic of Latvia. Due to high demand, the 3000 copies of the issue were sold out in a few days and an additional batch of 1000 books had to be printed.

Online version 
Since December 2018, the encyclopedia is also available online. The online version does not have a thematical focus and covers a wide variety of subjects on world culture, science, economics etc. By February 2019, around 900 articles had been published. By May 2022, the number had reached over 3000.

References 

 Valstiskās audzināšanas apakškomisija: Nacionālā enciklopēdija būs ieguldījums latviešu valodas stiprināšanā 2015-10-06</ref>
Enciklopēdijas satura izstrādes un publicēšanas tehnoloģiskās platformas un enciklopēdiska rakstura informācijas datu masīva iegāde iepirkums, Latvijas Nacionālā bibliotēka</ref>
Iepazīsimies ar Valteru Ščerbinski Baiba Haringtona, Laikraksts Latvietis Nr. 327, 2014-09-19</ref>
Top Latvijas Nacionālā enciklopēdija LETA, 2015-10-06</ref>
Linda Balode, Aiga Dambe (LV portāls) - Klajā nāk Nacionālā enciklopēdija</ref>

External links 
 
 About the encyclopedia at the website of the National Library

Websites
Latvian encyclopedias
Latvian books
Online encyclopedias
National encyclopedias
2018 non-fiction books